Kaszabellus is a genus of ground beetles in the family Carabidae. This genus has a single species, Kaszabellus formosanus. It is found in Taiwan and temperate Asia.

References

Platyninae